The Global Vipassana Pagoda is a Meditation dome hall with a capacity to seat around 8,000 Vipassana meditators (the largest such meditation hall in the world) near Gorai, north-west of Mumbai, Maharashtra, India. The pagoda was inaugurated by Pratibha Patil,  then President of India, on 8 February 2009. It is  built on donated land on a peninsula between Gorai creek and the Arabian Sea. The pagoda is to serve as a monument of peace and harmony. The Global Vipassana Pagoda has been built out of gratitude to Sayagyi U Ba Khin (1899 - 1971), Vipassana teacher and the first Accountant-General of Independent Burma, who was instrumental in Vipassana returning to India, the country of its origin.

Built entirely through voluntary donations, the purpose of the Global Vipassana Pagoda is to: 
1) Share information about Vipassana   

2) spread information on Gotama the Buddha and his teachings. 

Vipassanā is the practical quintessence of the universal, non-sectarian teachings of the Buddha.

Its traditional Burmese design is an expression of gratitude towards the country of Myanmar for preserving the practice of Vipassana. The shape of the pagoda is a copy of the Shwedagon Pagoda (Golden Pagoda) in Yangon, Myanmar. It was built combining ancient Indian and modern technology to enable it to last for a thousand years.

Description
The center of the Global Vipassana Pagoda contains the world's largest stone dome built without any supporting pillars. The height of the dome is approximately 29 meters, while the height of the building is 99.06 meters, which is twice the size of the previously largest hollow stone monument in the world, the Gol Gumbaz Dome in Bijapur, India. The external diameter of the largest section of the dome is 97.46 m and the shorter sections are 94.82m. The internal diameter is 85.15 m. The inside of the pagoda is hollow and serves as a very large meditation hall with an area covering more than 6000 m2 (65,000 ft2). The massive inner dome seats over 8000 people enabling them to practice the non-sectarian Vipassana meditation as taught by S. N. Goenka and now being practiced in over 100 countries. An inaugural one-day meditation course was held at the pagoda on 21 December 2008, with Goenka in attendance as the teacher.

Ten-day vipassana meditation courses are held free of charge at the Dhamma Pattana meditation center that is part of the Global Vipassana Pagoda complex.

Construction history

Timeline

Planning for the construction of the Global Vipassana Pagoda began in 1997, while actual building work started in 2000.
The pagoda consists of three sub-domes. The first and largest dome was completed in October 2006 when bone relics of Gotama Buddha were enshrined in the central locking stone of the dome on 29 October 2006, making it the world's largest structure containing relics of the Buddha. The relics were originally found in the stupa at Bhattiprolu, Guntur district, Andhra Pradesh, South India. They have been donated by the Mahabodhi Society of India and the prime minister of Sri Lanka to be kept at the Global Vipassana Pagoda. The second and third domes sit atop the first dome. Construction of the third dome was structurally completed on 21 November 2008.

The Global Vipassana Pagoda complex is an evolving construction. A museum depicts the historical life and non-sectarian teaching of Gotama the Buddha. The Global Vipassana Pagoda's educational displays communicate the Buddha's teaching of the universal practice of Vipassana as a path towards real happiness.

The Global Vipassana Pagoda complex consists of the following structures:
Pagoda dome containing relics of the Buddha. The pillar-less structure of the massive Pagoda dome encompasses a meditation hall to seat around 8,000 Vipassana meditators - the largest such meditation hall in the world.
Vipassana meditation centre Dhamma Pattana 
Museum depicting the historical life of the Buddha 
Two smaller pagodas on the north and south side 
Library and study rooms
Circumambulation path around the dome 
Administration building 
Underground parkade
Vipassana Research Institute office and facility for Pali study program
Dhammalaya Guest House for Vipassana meditators

The south pagoda contains 108 meditation cells for use by Vipassana students taking a meditation course at the adjoining meditation centre.

Construction materials
The foundation of the dome consists of basalt, while the dome itself is made from sandstone brought from Rajasthan. The individual blocks of sandstone weigh 600–700 kg each and are kept in place due to the unique design of the bricks. Each of the bricks interlock with the ones adjacent to it and lime mortar is used to fill in any remaining gaps. The circumambulation path is laid in marble.

The pinnacle of the pagoda is adorned with a large crystal. The spire is covered in real gold, while the rest of the pagoda is covered in gold paint. The spire is topped with a special ornamental umbrella piece donated by the Burmese. The main doors to the pagoda are wooden and hand-carved in Myanmar (Burma).

See also
 Satipatthana Sutta
 Vipassanā
 Ledi Sayadaw
 Webu Sayadaw
 Sayagyi U Ba Khin
 Vipassana Movement
 Doing Time, Doing Vipassana
 The Dhamma Brothers
 Cetiya
 Burmese pagoda

References

External links 

 
 Asia's spectacular monument of gratitude 2006 Asia Times article
 India's President to inaugurate Global Vipassana Pagoda Press release
 Indigenous tribute to the Buddha Online news article in The Hindu
 Official Site of Consulting and Structural Engineer

Buddhism in India
Buildings and structures completed in 2009
Meditation
Pagodas in India
Religious buildings and structures in Mumbai
Buddhist temples in India
Buddhist relics
Buddhist temples in Maharashtra